Johan-Oskar Rütli (19 December 1871 Ahja Parish (now Põlva Parish), Kreis Dorpat – 24 July 1949 Augsburg, Germany) was an Estonian politician. He was a member of II Riigikogu. On 24 January 1924, he resigned his position and he was replaced by Juhan Sepp.

References

1871 births
1949 deaths
People from Põlva Parish
People from Kreis Dorpat
russian Constitutional Democratic Party members
Landlords' Party politicians
Farmers' Assemblies politicians
Members of the 1st State Duma of the Russian Empire
Members of the Riigikogu, 1923–1926
Members of the Estonian National Assembly
Members of the Riiginõukogu
Hugo Treffner Gymnasium alumni
University of Tartu alumni
Estonian World War II refugees
Estonian emigrants to Germany